Piotr Lech (born 18 June 1968 in Kętrzyn) is a Polish retired goalkeeper and goalkeeping coach, currently working with Ruch Chorzów youth teams.

In 2018, he was announced as the Ruch Chorzów's goalkeeping coach.

References

1968 births
Living people
Ruch Chorzów players
Zagłębie Lubin players
GKS Katowice players
Górnik Zabrze players
GKS Bełchatów players
Jagiellonia Białystok players
Ekstraklasa players
LZS Piotrówka players
Polish footballers
Association football goalkeepers
People from Kętrzyn
Sportspeople from Warmian-Masurian Voivodeship